List of members of Slovenian Academy of Sciences and Arts.

A 
Lidija Andolšek-Jeras † -
Ivo Andrić † -
Mihajlo Apostoloski † -
Tatjana Avšič – Županc -

B 
Tadej Bajd - 
Anton Bajec † -
Aleksander Bajt † -
Krešimir Balenović † -
Derek Harold Richard Barton † -
Milan Bartoš † -
Janez Batis † - 
Mirko Bedjanič † - 
Friedrich-Karl Beier † - 
Aleksandar Belić † - 
Alojz Benac † - 
František Benhart - 
Arthur E. Bergles † - 
Oton Berkopec † - 
Emerik Bernard - 
France Bernik - 
Janez Bernik - 
France Bevk † - 
France Bezlaj † - 
Robert Blinc † - 
Milan Bogdanović † - 
Jože Bole † - 
Matej Bor † - 
Nikolaj A. Borisevič † - 
Marja Boršnik † - 
Ivan Brajdić - 
Vladislav Brajković † -
Ivan Bratko - 
Savo Bratos - 
Rajko Bratož - 
Matija Bravničar † - 
Bogdan Brecelj † -
Matej Brešar -
Anton Breznik † - 
Srečko Brodar † - 
Josip Broz - Tito † -
Miroslav Brzin † - 
Zoran Bujas † - 
Vaso Butozan † -

C 
Antonio Cardesa - 
Reinhart Ceulemans -
Henry R. Cooper mlajši -
Izidor Cankar † -
Emilijan Cevc † - 
Stojan Cigoj † -
Johann Cilenšek † -
Dragotin Cvetko † -

Č
Edhem Čamo † -
Franc Čelešnik † -
Bojan Čerček -
Avgust Černigoj † -
Bojan Čop † -
Vasa Čubrilović † -

D 
Aleksandar Despić † - 
Milan R. Dimitrijević - 
Davorin Dolar † - 
 - 
 † -

Mirko Deanović † -
Otto Demus † -
Aleksandar Despić † -
Jovan Djordjević † -
Branislav Djurdjev † -
Ilija Djuričić † -
Metod Dolenc † -
Lojze Dolinar † -
Boris Drujan † -
Ejnar Dyggve † -

E 
Norbert Elsner -

F 
Peter Fajfar - 
Arnold Feil - 
Dušan Ferluga - 
Aleksandar Flaker - 
Rudolf Flotzinger - 
Franc Forstnerič -

Janez Fettich † -
Alojzij Finžgar † -
Fran Saleški Finžgar † -
Kurt von Fischer † -
Aldo Franchini † -
Ivo Frangeš † -
Branko Fučić † -

G 
Stane Gabrovec † -
Franci Gabrovšek -
Ivan Gams † - 
Kajetan Gantar - 
Gerhard Giesemann -
Paul Gleirscher -
Josip Globevnik - 
Matija Gogala - 
Ljubo Golič - 
Wolfgang L. Gombocz - 
Peter Gosar - 
Igor Grabec - 
Niko Grafenauer - 
Stanko Grafenauer - 
Drago Grdenić - 
Irena Grickat-Radulović -

Maksim Gaspari † -
Milovan Gavazzi † -
Leon Geršković † -
Ferdo Gestrin † -
Otto F. Geyer † -
Velibor Gligorić † -
Pavel Golia † -
Jože Goričar † -
Anton Grad † -
Alojz Gradnik † -
Bogo Grafenauer † -
Ivan Grafenauer † -
Milan Grošelj † -
Franc Gubenšek † - 
Branimir Gušić † -
Ludvik Gyergyek † -

H 
Dušan Hadži - 
Jovan Hadži † -
Stanislav Hafner - 
Erwin Louis Hahn -
Nikola Hajdin - 
Toshihiro Hamano - 
Peter Handke - 
Ljudmil Hauptman † -
Harald zur Hausen -
Krsto Hegedušić † -
Milan Herak - 
Andrej Hieng † -
Matija Horvat † - 
Lukas Conrad Hottinger † - 
Valentin Hribar - 
Vil Hrymyč -

I 
Miodrag Ibrovac † -
Ljudevit Ilijanić - 
Svetozar Ilešič † -
Anton Ingolič † -
 † - 
Milka Ivić - 
Pavle Ivić † -

J 
Božidar Jakac † - 
Rihard Jakopič † -
Franc Jakopin † -
Matija Jama † -
Andrej Jemec -
Drago Jančar - 
Dimitrije Jovčić † -
Janko Jurančič † -

K 
Hans-Dietrich Kahl -
Boštjan Kaiuta -
Boris Kalin † -
Zdenko Kalin † -
Vinko Kambič † -
Stevan Karamata † - 
Edvard Kardelj † -
Alan R. Katritzky † - 
Roman Kenk † -
Gabrijel Kernel - 
Matjaž Kmecl - 
Dušan Kermavner † -
Taras Kermauner - 
Boris Kidrič † -
France Kidrič † -
Mile Klopčič † -
France Koblar † -
Vanda Kochansky-Devidé † -
Franjo Kogoj † -
Blaže Koneski † -
Zoran Konstantinović - 
Marjan Kordaš - 
Viktor Korošec † -
Božidar Kos † -
Gojmir Anton Kos † -
Janko Kos -
Milko Kos † -
Ciril Kosmač † -
Kajetan Kovič † -
Alojz Kralj -
Andrej Kranjc -
Jože Krašovec -
Metka Krašovec † -
Ivan Kreft -
Uroš Krek † -
Leopold Kretzenbacher -

Georg Kossack † -
Marko Kostrenčić † -
Alija Košir † -
Lojze Kovačič † -
Juš Kozak † -
Marjan Kozina † -
Venčeslav Koželj † -
Miško Kranjec † -
Stane Krašovec † -
Josef Kratochvíl † -
Miroslav Kravar † -
Ivo Krbek † -
Bratko Kreft † -
Gojmir Krek (tudi Gregor Krek) † -
Gustav Krklec † -
Miroslav Krleža † -
Anton Kuhelj † -
Othmar Kühn † -
Filip Kalan Kumbatovič † -
Niko Kuret † -
Ljubov' Viktorovna Kurkina -
Gorazd Kušej † -
Rado Kušej † -
Rudi Kyovsky † -

L 
Abel Lajtha -
Janez Lamovec -
Reinhard Lauer -
Anton Lajovic † -
Emmanuel Laroche † -
Ivan Lavrač † -
Božidar Lavrič † -
Janko Lavrin † -
Lojze Lebič -
Henry Leeming † -
Jean-Marie Pierre Lehn -
Rado L. Lenček † -
Janez Levec -
Florjan Lipuš -
Feliks Lobe † -
Janez Logar † -
Valentin Logar † -
Zdravko Lorković † -
Thomas Luckmann -
Radomir Lukić † -
Franc Ksaver Lukman † -
Pavel Lunaček † -

M 
Milan Maceljski -
Jože Maček -
Boris Majer -
Sibe Mardešić -
Juraj Martinović -
Milko Matičetov † -
Janez Matičič -
Ernest Mayer † -
Anne McLaren † -
Vasilij Melik † -
Janez Menart † -
Gian Carlo Menis -
Eugene Mylon Merchant -
Pavle Merkù † -
Dragan D. Mihailović -
Slavko Mihalič -
Milan Mihelič -
Emili Joseph Milič -
Ivan Minatti † -
Zdravko Mlinar -
Jože Mlinarič -
Dušan Moravec † -
Leszek Moszyński -
Karl Alexander Müller -
Hermann Müller-Karpe -
Marko Mušič -
Zoran Mušič † -

Desanka Maksimović † -
Janez Matjašič † -
Esad Mekuli † -
Anton Melik † -
Janez Menart † -
Boris Merhar † -
Kiril Micevski † -
Mihajlo Lj. Mihajlović † -
France Mihelič † -
Janez Milčinski † -
Lev Milčinski † -
Andre Mohorovičić † -
Vojeslav Molé † -
Matija Murko † -
Marjan Mušič † -

N 
Rajko Nahtigal † -
Vladimir A. Negovski † -
Velimir Neidhardt -
Zdeněk Nejedlý † -
Robert Neubauer † -
Rudolf Neuhäuser -
Jean Nicod - 
Kazimierz Nitsch † -
Jean Nougayrol † -
Franc Novak † -
Grga Novak † -

O 
Anton Ocvirk † -
Wacław Olszak † -
Valentin Oman -
Janez Orešnik - 
Karel Oštir † -

P 
Boris Pahor † -
Luko Paljetak -
Boris Paternu -
Tone Pavček  † -
Marijan Pavčnik -
Branko Pavičević -
Janez Peklenik -
Slobodan Perović -
Márton Pécsi -
Raša Pirc -
Jože Pirjevec -
Mario Pleničar -
Janko Pleterski -
Boris Podrecca -
Livio Poldini -
Andrej Vladimirovič Popov -
Bogdan Povh -
Otto Prokop -
Eugen Pusić † -

Dimitar Panteleev † -
Alfonz Pavlin † -
Todor Pavlov † -
Leonid Semenovič Persianinov † -
Anton Peterlin † -
Leonid Pitamic † -
Jože Plečnik † -
Josip Plemelj † -
Jože Pogačnik † -
Janko Polec † -
Ivan Potrč † -
Vladimir Prelog † -
Stojan Pretnar † -
Dušan C. Prevoršek † -

R 
Chintamani Nagesa Ramachandra Rao -
Fran Ramovš † -
Alojz Rebula -
Uroš Rojko -
Helmut Rumpler -
Veljko Rus -
Ivan Rakovec † -
Alfred Rammelmeyer † -
Fran Ramovš † -
Primož Ramovš † -
Zoran Rant † -
Edvard Ravnikar † -
Karl Heinz Rechinger † -
Ivan Regen † -
Jakob Rigler † -

S 
Gregor Serša -
Roy Thomas Severn -
Primož Simoniti -
Uroš Skalerič -
Janez Sketelj -
Marko Snoj -
Slavko Splichal -
Jan Stankowski -
Janez Stanonik † -
Marija Stanonik -
Branko Stanovnik -
Dimitrije Stefanović -
Erik Valdemar Stĺlberg -
Jože Straus -
Franc Strle -
Ivo Supičić -
Saša Svetina -

Harald Saeverud † -
Peter Safar † -
Marijan Salopek † -
Maks Samec † -
Pavle Savić † -
Ferdinand Seidl † -
Savin Sever † -
Jakov Sirotković † -
Petar Skok † -
Anton Slodnjak † -
Anica Sodnik-Zupanc † -
Anton Sovré † -
Siniša Stanković † -
France Stelé † -
Pavel Stern † -
Petar Stevanović † -
Gabrijel Stupica † -
Gunnar Olaf Svane† -
János Szentágothai † -

Š 
Jaroslav Šašel † -
Tomaž Šalamun † -
Rudi Šeligo † -
Alenka Šelih -
Alojz Šercelj - 
Jaroslav Šidak † -
Lucijan Marija Škerjanc † -
Milan Škerlj † -
Stanko Škerlj † -
Janko Šlebinger † -
Makso Šnuderl † -
Peter Štih -
Andrija Štampar † -
Lujo Šuklje † -

T 
Sergio Tavano -
Biba Teržan -
Miha Tišler † -
Miha Tomaževič -
Jože Toporišič † -
Jože Trontelj -
Drago Tršar -
Dragica Turnšek -

Alois Tavčar † -
Igor Tavčar † -
Alan John Percival Taylor † -
Lucien Tesnière † -
Kosta Todorović † -
Božena Tokarz -
Nikita Iljič Tolstoj † -
Rajko Tomović † -
Rudolf Trofenik † -
Anton Trstenjak † -

U 
Felix Unger -

Jože Udovič † -
Aleš Ušeničnik † -

V 
Sergej Ivanovič Vavilov † -
Lado Vavpetič † -
Franc Veber † -
Ivan Vidav † -
Josip Vidmar † -
Milan Vidmar † -
Sergij Vilfan † -
John Villadsen -
Lojze Vodovnik † -
Vale Vouk † -
Anton Vratuša -
Igor Vrišer † - 
Dimitrije Vučenov † -

W 
John S. Waugh † -
Anton Wernig -
Herwig Wolfram -
Frank Wollman † -
Karl Matej Woschitz - 
Maks Wraber † -

Z 
Marijan Zadnikar -
Franc Zadravec -
Ciril Zlobec † -
Robert Zorec -
Zinka Zorko -
Mitja Zupančič -

Marijan Zadnikar † -
Dane Zajc † -
Vilem Závada † -
Boris Ziherl † -
Rihard Zupančič † -
Fran Zwitter † -

Ž 
Boštjan Žekš -
Slavoj Žižek -
Zinka Zorko † -
Andrej O. Župančič - 
Oton Župančič † -

Slovenian Academy Of Sciences And Arts